SUnit is a unit testing framework for the programming language Smalltalk.  It is the original source of the xUnit design, originally written by one of the creators of Extreme Programming, Kent Beck. SUnit allows writing tests and checking results in Smalltalk.

History 
SUnit was originally described by Beck in "Simple Smalltalk Testing: With Patterns" (1989), then published as chapter 30 "Simple Smalltalk Testing", in the book Kent Beck's Guide to Better Smalltalk by Kent Beck, Donald G. Firesmith (Editor) (Publisher: Cambridge University Press, Pub. Date: December 1998, 408pp)

External links 
  @ Camp Smalltalk
 SUnit @ Ward Cunningham's Wiki

Extreme programming
Unit testing frameworks
Unit testing